Ville is a French word and English suffix meaning "city" or "town".

Ville may also refer to:

People
 Ville (given name), a Finnish and Swedish male given name

Places
 Ville, Oise, a commune in northern France
 Villé, a commune in the Bas-Rhin department in north-eastern France
 Ville (Germany), a range of hills in the Lower Rhine Bay in western Germany
 The Ville, St. Louis, a historic neighborhood in North St. Louis
 The Ville, a nickname for Somerville College, Oxford, United Kingdom

Other uses
 The Ville (video game), 2012 video game

See also
 Deville (disambiguation)